The Hours is a stipple engraving by a master of the technique, Francesco Bartolozzi (1725–1815), published on April 4, 1788, from the print shop of Thomas Macklin, at No. 39 Fleet Street, London.  The print is based upon a painting by Maria Cosway (1760–1838). The dancing hours, or nymphs of Greek mythology, were a pictorial representation of the 1742 poem "Ode on the Spring" by British poet Thomas Gray (1716–1771). The poem begins:

"Lo! where the rosy-bosomed Hours,
Fair Venus' train, appear,
Disclose the long-expecting flowers,
And wake the purple year!
The Attic warbler pours her throat,
Responsive to the cuckoo's note,
The untaught harmony of spring:
While, whisp'ring pleasure as they fly,
Cool Zephyrs thro' the clear blue sky
Their gathered fragrance fling."

Maria Cosway sent a copy of the engraving to Jacques-Louis David (1748–1825), a highly influential French painter, who stated, "on ne peut pas faire une poesie plus ingenieuse et plus naturelle." ("One couldn't make poetry more ingenious and more natural.")

The stippling technique 

The stippling technique involved the etching, usually on a copper plate, of stipple dots to form an image. The process was tedious; many thousands of these dots were required to form an image of this quality. After the copper plate was etched, it was then used to make a number of prints by the usual intaglio method. The number depended upon how well the plate held up during the printing process, which abraded the plate slightly with each use. The earlier prints, therefore, were of better quality than the later ones. At some point the plate became so abraded that it was no longer usable.

The printing and coloring (hand washing) of each engraving was difficult, and required the hand of an artist. For that reason, many of these old original prints were inked by the master himself.

Stippling is used to excellent effect in representing transparent materials in the filmy gowns and gossamer wings of the nymphs.

Details from The Hours

The title

The credits

Publication information

References 

"Jacques-Louis David's Anglophilia on the Eve of the French Revolution", by Philippe Bordes, in The Burlington Magazine, 1992. The article reproduced the engraving of The Hours on page 485.
The full text of "Ode on the Spring" may be found at the Thomas Gray Archive.

1788 works
18th-century engravings
Dance in art
Horae